The Hong Kong Broadcasting Authority (HKBA) was an organisation responsible for licensing and regulating the broadcasting industry in Hong Kong. It was formed in 1987. The organisation was authorised to investigate complaints made regarding programmes, issue warnings and fines, or even suspend the license of the radio or television station.

Since April 2012, Hong Kong Broadcasting Authority, along with Television and Entertainment Licensing Authority and Office of the Telecommunications Authority was merged to form the Communications Authority.

Comparisons
Similar bodies around the world are:
Australia: Australian Communications and Media Authority
Canada: Canadian Radio-television and Telecommunications Commission (CRTC)
France: Superior Audiovisual Council (formerly the ORTF)
United Kingdom: Ofcom
United States: Federal Communications Commission (FCC)

See also
 Television and Entertainment Licensing Authority

External links
Hong Kong Broadcasting Authority Homepage 

Broadcasting Authority
Broadcasting Authority
1987 establishments in Hong Kong
2012 disestablishments in Hong Kong
Government agencies established in 1987
Government agencies disestablished in 2012
Broadcasting authorities
Broadcasting in Hong Kong